Kasabova Glacier is the 6 km long and 3.5 km wide glacier on Davis Coast in Graham Land on the Antarctic Peninsula.  Draining the slopes of Mount Bris, Chubra Peak, Sredorek Peak and Chanute Peak in Korten Ridge, the glacier flows northwestwards to enter Orléans Strait at the head of Lanchester Bay.

The glacier is named for the Bulgarian pioneer of aviation Rayna Kasabova (1897-1957), a volunteer in the First Balkan War who became the first woman to take part in a combat air mission on October 30, 1912.

Location
British-German mapping in 1996.

Map
 Trinity Peninsula. Scale 1:250000 topographic map No. 5697. Institut für Angewandte Geodäsie and British Antarctic Survey, 1996.

References
 Kasabova Glacier. SCAR Composite Gazetteer of Antarctica.
 Bulgarian Antarctic Gazetteer. Antarctic Place-names Commission. (details in Bulgarian, basic data in English)

External links
 Kasabova Glacier. Copernix satellite image

Bulgaria and the Antarctic
Glaciers of Davis Coast